Broadmead Baptist Church is a Baptist church in the Broadmead area of Bristol, England.

The church was the first dissenting church in Bristol, founded by Dorothy Hazard and four other dissenters in 1640.  In its early years the church was persecuted and met in various locations around Bristol, but in 1671 the members of the church secured four rooms at the end of Broadmead, which were quickly converted into one large room for use as a chapel.  The chapel continued in use until the 1960s.  When the Broadmead area was redeveloped the church sold the ground lease for shops and built a new church above. The new church was designed by the architect Ronald Hubert Sims and opened in 1969. It features many brutalist elements, with the widespread use of raw concrete alongside timber panelling. When first opened, it featured a laminated timber spire that was removed due to being unsafe.

References

External links 
Broadmead Baptist Church website

Baptist churches in Bristol
Churches completed in 1969
1640 establishments in England